The 1998–99 Cypriot Fourth Division was the 14th season of the Cypriot fourth-level football league. THOI Lakatamia won their 1st title.

Format
Fourteen teams participated in the 1998–99 Cypriot Fourth Division. All teams played against each other twice, once at their home and once away. The team with the most points at the end of the season crowned champions. The first three teams were promoted to the 1999–2000 Cypriot Third Division and the last four teams were relegated to regional leagues.

Point system
Teams received three points for a win, one point for a draw and zero points for a loss.

Changes from previous season
Teams promoted to 1998–99 Cypriot Third Division
 SEK Agiou Athanasiou
 ATE PEK Ergaton
 Doxa Paliometochou

Teams relegated from 1997–98 Cypriot Third Division
 AEK Kakopetrias
 Kinyras Empas
 THOI Lakatamia

Teams promoted from regional leagues
 AOL Omonia Lakatamias
 AEK Kythreas
 AMEP Parekklisia
 MEAP Nisou

Teams relegated to regional leagues
 Anorthosi Polemidion
 Salamina Dromolaxias
 Fotiakos Frenarou

League standings

Results

See also
 Cypriot Fourth Division
 1998–99 Cypriot First Division
 1998–99 Cypriot Cup

Sources

Cypriot Fourth Division seasons
Cyprus
1998–99 in Cypriot football